Zhang Min may refer to:

Zhang Min (figure skater) (born 1976),  Chinese figure skater
Zhang Min (rower) (born 1993), Chinese rower
Zhang Min (politician), a discipline inspector for the Communist Party of China
Zhang Qi (Song dynasty) (died 1048), or Zhang Min, Song dynasty official and military general
Sharla Cheung (born 1967), or Zhang Min, Hong Kong actress
Aman Chang, or Zhang Min, Hong Kong film director
Li Guangchang, or Zhang Min, a sect leader and self-declared emperor